Drottningskär is a locality situated on the island of Aspö in Karlskrona Municipality, Blekinge County, Sweden with 328 inhabitants in 2005. It gives its name to a nearby 17th-century naval citadel, now part of the Karlskrona naval city World Heritage Site.

References 

Populated places in Karlskrona Municipality